La Galerie du Nouvel-Ontario is an art gallery in Sudbury, Ontario, Canada.

Originally launched in 1974 by artists associated with the Cooperative des artistes du Nouvel-Ontario, the gallery was first established as part of La Slague, a local Franco-Ontarian community centre. It later moved to the Centre des jeunes, a Franco-Ontarian youth centre, after La Slague ceased operations.

In 1995, the gallery was incorporated as a separate organization.

The gallery focuses primarily on contemporary art by Franco-Ontarian artists.

It is slated to move in 2022 to the new Place des Arts facility in downtown Sudbury.

References

External links
 La Galerie du Nouvel-Ontario

Art museums and galleries in Ontario
Museums in Greater Sudbury
Franco-Ontarian organizations
Art galleries established in 1974
1974 establishments in Ontario